Julia Kissina (born 1966 in Kyiv), is a German and Russian artist and writer.

Biography 
Julia Kissina was born in 1966 in Kyiv, Ukraine, to a Jewish family, and studied dramatic writing at the Gerasimov Institute of Cinematography in Moscow, also known as VGIK. A political refugee, she immigrated to Germany in 1990, where she later graduated from the Academy of Fine Arts in Munich.

A longtime member of the Moscow Conceptualist movement and one of the best known authors of Russian literary avant-garde, Kissina had been a regular contributor to the two of Russia's Samizdat literature journals, "Obscuri Viri" and "Mitin Journal". Her début short novel "Of the Dove's Flight Over the Mud of Phobia" (1992), became a cult hit of "Samizdat". Kissina's poetry and prose subsequently appeared in numerous journals and anthologies, including the much-translated anthology of modern Russian literature, "Russian Flowers of Evil" (1997). Her first collection of stories in German "Vergiss Tarantino" (tr: Forget Tarantino) was published in 2005, the same year as her children’s book "Milin und der Zauberstift" (tr: Milin and the Magic Pencil). Her style, characterized by whimsical humor, precise observations of social conflicts and a distinct sense of the absurd, can be described as auto-fictional fabulism. An essential theme of her work is "civilization and its discontents". Despite intertextual experiments with words and subjects, her books are intricately plotted. Her  novel "Frühling auf dem Mond" (2013, tr: Springtime on the Moon) draws from her childhood in the 1970s Kyiv, exploring the tragic dynamic between surreal perception and bureaucratic despotism. Written in a similar style, her novel "Elephantinas Moskauer Jahre" (2016, tr: Elephantina’s Moscow Years) is a coming-of-age story about a young woman who moves to Moscow to explore the depths of the artistic underground in search of true poetry.

Julia Kissina is also known as a visual artist, having devoted herself to conceptual photography in the 1990s. In 2000, she herded an actual flock of sheep into the Museum of Modern Art in Frankfurt as part of a performance. She also co-curated the Art & Crime Festival at the Hebbel Theater, Berlin, in 2003 and performed in a German prison. In 2006 she created The Dead Artist's Society, which held séances to conduct "Dialogues with Classics" such as Duchamp and Malevich.

Publications 
 "Elephantinas Moscow Years", novel, Suhrkamp Verlag, Berlin, 2016; Zvezda, St. Petersburg, 2015; Fabula, Ukraine, 2017
 "Springtime on the Moon", novel, Azbuka Publishers, St. Petersburg, 2012; German. Suhrkamp Verlag, Berlin, 2013; Fabula, Ukraine, 2016
  "Forget Tarantino", Aufbau-Verlag, Berlin, 2005;
 "The Smile of the Ax", Colonna Publications, St. Petersburg/Prague, 2007
  "Milin and the Magic Pencil", children's book, Bloomsbury/Berlin Verlag, 2005
  "Simple Desires", Alethea Press, St. Petersburg, 2001 (Nominated for the Andrei Bely Prize)
 "The Devil's Childhood", novel, Obscuri viri, Moscow, 1993
 "The Dove's Flight Over the Mud of Phobia", novel, Obscuri viri, Moscow, 1997

Art books 
 "Dead Artists Society", Verlag für moderne Kunst, Nuremberg, 2010
 "When Shadows Cast People", Peperoni Books, Berlin, 2010
 "Dead Artists Society", The Library of Moscow Conceptualism, Russia, 2011

Anthologies and collections 
 "Artenol" Magazine, New York, 2016
 "A Thousand Poets, One Language", Anthology, A Mohammed bin Rashid al Maktoum Foundation, Dubai, 2009
 "21 new storytellers" Anthology, DTV, Munich, 2003
 "Russian flowers of the evil", ed. Viktor Yerofeev, Anthology, Eksmo, Moscow,1997
 "Ruské kvety zla", Belimex, Anthology, Slovakia, 2001
 "Les fleurs du mal", Anthology, A. Michel, Paris, 1997
 "I fiori del male russi", Anthology, Voland, Roma, 2001
 "Cuentos rusos", Anthology, Siruela, Madrid, 2006
 "Tema lesarva", Anthology, Gabo, Budapest, 2005
 "Contemporary Russian Prose", Anthology, ed. Vladimir Sorokin, Zakharov Books, Moscow, 2003
 "Il casualitico" (Fernando Pessoa, Amélie Nothomb, Valentino Zaichen, Renzo Paris, Franco Purini, Julia Kissina), Voland Press, Rome, 2003
 Magazine "Lettre International", N-71, Budapest, 2008
 Magazine "New Literature", Bucharest, 4/1994
 Magazine "Schreibheft", No. 59, Essen, Germany, 2002
 Magazine "Via Regia", No. 48/49, Berlin,1997
 Mitin Journal, Petersburg/ Praha, Annually –

Editor and curator 
 Julia Kissina, / Revolution Noir – Autoren der russischen »neuen Welle« German. Suhrkamp Verlag, Berlin, 2017 , an anthology of contemporary Russian avant-garde literature including such writers as Vladimir Sorokin, Pavel Pepperstein, Youlia Belomlinskaja etc. translated into German.

 In Riga - A Memoir by Boris Lurie Edited and Introduced by Julia Kissina; Printed in the USA 

 Berlin / New York = URBAN DICTIONARY literature festival, Summer, 2018; curator. URBAN DICTIONARY  brought together writers and poets from  Berlin and New York. https://nyb-festival.de/en/

Praise 

 Julia Kissina herself is a marvellous hybrid creature: internationally acting artist with an oeuvre of installations, photography and performances on the one hand and one of the most unconventional contemporary Russian writers on the other. [...] Her literary archeology of late socialism seems not at all reactionary but highly topical, as it does with Esterházy, Cărtărescu or Tellkamp: because it’s the influences and mentalities of that time that cause the grotesques and tragedies in the Eastern European present. / Alexander Camman, Die Zeit, Germany
 "Elephantina‘s Moskow Years” is a veritable inferno of a novel: smart, funny, imaginative, with powerful scenes./ Meike Fessmann, Süddeutsche Zeitung, Germany
 Kissina breaks open metaphors and puts them together anew, so that you have to laugh out loud or marvel at the sheer originality of it all. [...] The colorful, grotesque, poetic images of «Elephantina» do not portray the well-known Moscow of the eighties, but evoke something quite different: a wild, anarchic counterculture. / Elisa von Hof, Berliner Morgenpost, Germany
 There is hardly another book that illuminates the connexion of tyranny and subversion, of submission and autonomy, better than this novel./ Andreas Breitenstein, NZZ, Switzerland
 Her unflinching will to see grotesque in the ugly, the supernatural in beauty, and the thread of the absurd running through it all, is a victory over the hardness of reality. That is what art, every art, can do. But it is rarely shown as inspiringly as here.  / Katarina Granzin, Frankfurter Rundschau, Germany
 A true odyssey through the cold and strange city – James Joyce could not have described it more radically or more closely. Julia Kissina's language is a linguistic firework. It does not bore for a single moment, and despite the often bitter "gutter" story, a defiant humor flourishes throughout./ Barbara Raudszus, EGOTRIP, Germany

References 
 Eagles and Partridges — from Russian by Steven Volynets — Jewish Fiction journal
 Julia Kissina – Suhrkamp Berlin
 Fairies – Photographs by Julia Kissina – Sensitive Skin Magazine
 Julia Kissina – Harpers Magazine

External links 
 

1966 births
Living people
Russian writers
Artists from Berlin